The Palace of Villamejor is a palace located on the Paseo de la Castellana in Madrid, Spain. The state purchased it in 1914 from the Marquesses of Villamejor to serve as the residence of the Prime Minister, a role that it maintained until 1976, when Adolfo Suárez moved the official residence over to the Palace of Moncloa. The palace now houses the Ministry for Territorial Policy.

Conservation
The 19th century building was declared a Property of Cultural Interest in 2003.

References 

Palaces in Madrid
Bien de Interés Cultural landmarks in Madrid
Buildings and structures in Almagro neighborhood, Madrid
Prime ministerial residences